Sweden Bass Orchestra is an album by Danish jazz bassist Niels-Henning Ørsted Pedersen, recorded in 1995 for Four Leaf Clover (FLC 141).

Track listing
 "Donna Lee"—5:06
 "Softly, As in a Morning Sunrise"—9:49
 "Misty"—5:03
 "Here's That Rainy Day"—7:08
 "So What"—6:17
 "A Blue Banana"—4:49
 "I Hear a Rhapsody"—4:05
 "Chillin' Elephants"—6:09
 "Somewhere over the Rainbow"—2:30

Personnel
Niels-Henning Ørsted Pedersen—double bass
Jonas Reingold—piccolo bass (1st bass)
Patrik Albin—double bass (2nd bass)
Karl Magnusson—double bass (3rd bass)
Peter Anderhagen—fretless bass (4th bass)
Mattias Hjort—double bass (5th bass)
Ola Bothzén—drums

All arrangements by Jonas Reingold except "Somewhere over the Rainbow," arranged by Mattias Hjort.

References

1995 albums